The Anti arms smuggling operations launched by the Sri Lanka Navy between September 2006 and October 2007, were several successful interceptions in the Indian Ocean of rouge merchant ships that transported arms and ammunition to the LTTE.

References

Battles of Eelam War IV
Anti arms smuggling operations
2006 in Sri Lanka
2007 in Sri Lanka
2006 in military history
2007 in military history